Gårdlösa is the site of an Iron Age settlement in the parish of Smedstorp in Skåne, Sweden. It was inhabited shortly during the late Nordic Bronze Age, and from the 1st century BC–11th century AD.

In 1949, a woman's grave from the Roman Iron Age was found in Gårdlösa. It had a silver fibula on which there was a runic inscription. In 1963–1976, there were archaeological excavations of house foundations, grave fields and a shrine. The rich and varied material has enabled scholars to perform cross-domain studies of the inhabitants' social, economic and religious life, giving a good picture of an Iron Age agricultural settlement and its resources.

There are two stone circles, and two irregularly shaped cobble-clad graves and a smaller one, as well as a circular formation of stones from the late Vendel Age or the Viking Age.

References 
 Nationalencyklopedin
 A master thesis in Swedish on the archaeology of Scania

Archaeological sites in Sweden
Germanic archaeological sites
Megalithic monuments in Europe
Former populated places in Sweden